Truncatella vincentiana is a species of very small land snail that lives next to saltwater, a gastropod mollusk or micromollusk in the family Truncatellidae.

Distribution and habitat
This small snail is endemic to southern and southwestern Australia, including Tasmania. It lives in the intertidal zone, on mud flats.

Description
The average shell length is 5 mm.

References

 Molluscs of Tasmania info

Littorinidae
Gastropods described in 1942